Erynia may refer to:

 889 Erynia, a minor planet
 Erynia (fungus), a genus in the family Entomophthoraceae

See also
 Erynnia, a genus of fly